The Citizens' Movement Pro Chemnitz (German: Bürgerbewegung Pro Chemnitz; known as Pro Chemnitz) is a municipal political party in the German city of Chemnitz.

History
The Citizens' Movement Pro Chemnitz was initiated in 2009 by Karl Martin Kohlmann, a former Chemnitz city council member for The Republicans, and Reinhold Breede, former president of the city council at the beginning of the 1990s and a former CDU member.

In March 2009 the city council group of The Republicans left the party en bloc, owing to internal disputes, and became part of Pro Chemnitz and therefore the Citizens' Movement's parliamentary group.

In November 2019, online payment service PayPal blocked the movement's account after more than 100,000 people petitioned it.

Elections
In the 2009 Chemnitz municipal election, the Citizens' Movement Pro Chemnitz received 12,608 votes, 4.57 per cent of the electorate, and as a result hold three out of 60 seats in the city council.

References

External links
 Official website of the Citizens' Movement Pro Chemnitz
 Citizens' Movement Pro Chemnitz on Twitter

Conservative parties in Germany
Local political parties in Germany
Right-wing populism in Germany